Design and Art Direction (D&AD), formerly known as British Design and Art Direction, is a British educational organisation that was created in 1962 to promote excellence in design and advertising. Its main offices are in Spitalfields in London. It is most famous for its annual awards, the D&AD Pencils. The highest award given by D&AD, the Black Pencil, is not necessarily awarded every year.

History

Origins (1962–1977)
D&AD was founded in 1962 by a group of London-based designers and art directors including David Bailey, Terence Donovan, Alan Fletcher, and Colin Forbes (who designed the original D&AD logo). A panel of 25 judged the 2500 entries to the first awards in 1963. They awarded one Black Pencil (to Geoffrey Jones Films) and 16 Yellow Pencils. Early winners received an ebony pencil box designed by Marcello Minale, one of the founding partners of Minale Tattersfield, which contained a pencil with silver lettering. In 1966 it was replaced by a more durable award. Its education programmes in their infancy, D&AD launched graphic workshops in association with the Royal College of Art in the mid-1960s. They ran until the mid-1970s. Designer Michael Wolff became the first elected president of D&AD in 1970. Six years later, then-president Alan Parker gave the first D&AD President’s Award for outstanding contribution to creativity to Colin Millward of Collett Dickenson Pearce.

Introduction of Student Awards (1978–1990)
D&AD education programmes continued to grow in 1978 when Dave Trott set up the D&AD Advertising Workshops. In 1979, initiated by Sir John Hegarty of Bartle Bogle Hegarty, the Student Awards were launched. Bridging the gap between college and work, the awards present students with real world briefs to tackle. The awards had already started to recognise a wider range of categories through the 1960s and 1970s and photography, retail design (now environmental design), music videos, and product design became part of the awards in the 1980s. The awards also opened up to international entries for the first time in 1988. Controversy surrounded a decision to hold separate advertising and design awards in 1986 and 1987; the separation, made for practical reasons based on the chosen venue, was seen by members as a split between industries. Afterward, the ceremony did come back under one roof, where it has remained.

Move to Graphite Square, Vauxhall (1990–2012) 
D&AD moved to Graphite Square, in Vauxhall in the 1990s. The first Student Expo (now New Blood) and the University Network, the D&AD membership programme for university and college courses, launched in 1993. The first session of "Xchange" took place in 1996. It was described as a ‘summer school’ for college lecturers and creative practitioners updated participants on the latest industry trends. D&AD launched its website in 1996 and introduced its first digital categories to the awards in 1997. D&AD celebrated its 40th birthday in 2002 with Rewind, a retrospective exhibition and book of some of the most iconic work since the 1960s at the Victoria & Albert Museum.

A new benchmark was set at the turn of the century when a double Black Pencil was awarded to the AMV.BBDO ‘Surfer’ for Guinness for its visuals. This was matched five years later by ‘Grrr’, Wieden + Kennedy London's work for Honda UK. In 2006 another milestone was set as leoburnett.com won the first digital Black Pencil. Developments in the industry meant that two new categories were added in 2008, broadcast innovations and mobile marketing. That year, Apple Inc. won a Black Pencil for the iMac and the first-generation iPhone.

Design Workshops were relaunched in 2006 and D&AD North, its first regional network, in Manchester the same year. The Student Awards have become an increasingly international event. Entries in 2007 came from colleges in more than 40 countries. Italian design group Fabrica designed The annual outside the UK for the first time in 2007 and the showreel moved online that same year.

50th year and beyond (2012–present) 
In 2012, D&AD moved to a location on Hanbury Street. It celebrated its 50th anniversary by honouring the most successful award-winners in its history with a special edition Taschen D&AD Annual featuring 50 different covers. An auction of the original artwork was help at The Hospital Club. In the same year, the D&AD Foundation was established, with a remit to nurture creative talent.

In 2015, the organisation relocated briefly to a co-working space until construction of its current permanent premises on Cheshire Street was completed.

D&AD Awards 
The following are the D&AD Pencil award levels:
D&AD Wood Pencil
Represents the best in advertising and design from the year.
D&AD Graphite Pencil 
Awarded to stand-out work, well executed with an original idea at its core.
D&AD Yellow Pencil
Awarded only to the most outstanding work that achieves true creative excellence.
D&AD Black Pencil 
The ultimate creative accolade, reserved for work that is ground-breaking in its field. Only a handful are awarded each year.
D&AD White Pencil
Reserved for exceptional and game-changing projects that have resulted in significant impact.

D&AD presidents
Each year the D&AD elects a president from the creative community. They are always D&AD Award winners.

Further reading
Rewind: 40 years of Design and Advertising by Jeremy Myerson and Graham Vickers; Publisher: Phaidon Press; .
The Copy Book, 1995 / 2011, Publisher: Taschen, 
D&AD 50 by D&AD; Publisher: Taschen; .

See also
 History of advertising in Britain

References

External links
 D&AD website
 D&AD Student Awards website

Educational charities based in the United Kingdom
Design awards